The violet-necked lory (Eos squamata) is a species of parrot in the family Psittaculidae. It is endemic to Indonesia, where it is found in the northern Maluku Islands and west Papuan islands. Its natural habitats are tropical moist lowland forests and tropical mangrove forests.

Taxonomy
The violet-necked lory was described by the French polymath Georges-Louis Leclerc, Comte de Buffon in 1780 in his Histoire Naturelle des Oiseaux from a specimen obtained from the island of Gebe in the Maluku Islands of eastern Indonesia. The bird was also illustrated in a hand-coloured plate engraved by François-Nicolas Martinet in the Planches Enluminées D'Histoire Naturelle which was produced under the supervision of Edme-Louis Daubenton to accompany Buffon's text.  Neither the plate caption nor Buffon's description included a scientific name but in 1783 the Dutch naturalist Pieter Boddaert coined the binomial name Psittacus squamatus in his catalogue of the Planches Enluminées. The violet-necked lory is now placed in the genus Eos that was introduced by the German naturalist Johann Georg Wagler in 1832. The genus name is from the Ancient Greek eōs meaning "dawn". The specific epithet squamata is from the Latin squamatus meaning "scaled".

Three subspecies are recognised:
 E. s. riciniata (Bechstein, 1811) – north Moluccas
 E. s. obiensis Rothschild, 1899 – Obi and Bisa Islands (north central Moluccas)
 E. s. squamata (Boddaert, 1783) – west Papuan islands

Description
It bears a strong resemblance to the female eclectus parrot except it has an orange-yellow beak. It is mostly red and blue with a blue abdomen. its extent of blue neck collar depends on subspecies. It has red and black in wings and a purple-red tail.

Gallery

References

Cited texts
 

violet-necked lory
Birds of the Maluku Islands
Birds described in 1783
Taxonomy articles created by Polbot